The Electronic Federal Tax Payment System (EFTPS) is an online federal tax payment system in the United States designed and maintained by the Internal Revenue Service (IRS) and Bureau of the Fiscal Service branches of the United States Department of the Treasury.

History
The Internal Revenue Service contracted with First Chicago Corporation, National Computer Systems, AT&T, IBM, Mercantile Bancorp, and Intranet to develop EFTPS in 1994. NationsBank and First National Bank of Chicago were contracted to monitor electronic payment transmissions, prepare financial reports, and develop the database systems for EFTPS. EFTPS was originally anticipated to be available to the corporations in mid-1995 and available to individuals in 1996. By eliminating certain paperwork and automating certain systems, the Department of the Treasury estimated that EFTPS would save at least $433million in savings by 1999. EFTPS replaced TaxLink, an older electronic tax payment system that began in 1993.

Businesses with annual employment tax payments of at least $47million were required to use EFTPS in 1996, while businesses with annual employment tax payments of at least $50,000 were required to use EFTPS by 1997. For businesses who were required to EFTPS, the IRS delayed assessing penalties for non-compliance until June 30, 1997. Other businesses were allowed to use EFTPS voluntarily. The IRS mailed letters to most businesses announcing EFTPS and encouraging them to begin using it.

Services
EFTPS allows individuals and businesses to make their tax and estimated tax payments securely online using their bank accounts. Payments can be made only after enrolling in the system, and the enrollment process can take about a week (initial online enrollment is followed by relevant information being sent by physical mail, after which the online enrollment process may be completed). The enrollment process includes information about the bank account from which one's payments will be debited.

Payments must be scheduled at least 1 day and at most 365 days in advance. Separate modalities exist for same-day payment.

A Forbes article about EFTPS recommends using the service to make estimated tax payments, noting that one can schedule payments in advance but also modify the payments in case of some unexpected changes to plans. The article also notes the importance of planning in advance the first year one intends to use the service: "The first year you sign up for the federal online system you need some lead time because a PIN is sent via snail mail within five to seven days. Then you go back online to set up your quarterly estimated payments, plugging in your checking account information and the dates you want the estimated payments withdrawn."

Privacy
The EFTPS website claims that the Internal Revenue Service and other government agencies do not obtain access to the enrollee's account, and only payments explicitly scheduled or authorized by the enrollee are processed by the website. In particular, the EFTPS account cannot be used by the IRS to confiscate assets if they believe that taxes were underpaid.

See also
 IRS e-file

References

External links
 

Internal Revenue Service